Hugh Campbell House is a historic building near Harrison, Ohio. It was listed in the National Register of Historic Places on November 7, 1976.

The Hugh Campbell House was built 1854–1860 and is an excellent example of Italianate Villa architecture. Its builder, Hugh Campbell, was born in 1828 in County Tyrone, Ireland, and immigrated with his father to Philadelphia. He became a cattleman and contractor.  In 1858 Hugh Married Martha A. Green.  They had no children. Many nieces and nephews and a few servants lived in the home originally.  Both are buried in Spring Grove Cemetery in Cincinnati and Hugh donated a significant portion of his estate to local orphanages when he died in 1901. The house was originally red brick, but painted over.

Notes 

Houses on the National Register of Historic Places in Ohio
Houses in Hamilton County, Ohio
National Register of Historic Places in Hamilton County, Ohio
Houses completed in 1859
Harrison, Ohio